Lucanus placidus is a beetle of the family Lucanidae.

placidus
Beetles described in 1825